Alfredo Mantovano (born 14 January 1958) is an Italian politician and magistrate.

Biography
Born in Lecce on 14 January 1958, he graduated in law at the Sapienza University of Rome in 1981. In 1983 he began his career as a magistrate.

He has been a journalist since 1984 and collaborates with the weekly Tempi and with various other newspapers.

From 2015 to 2022 he was president of the Italian section of the pontifical foundation Aid to the Church in Need, which deals with religious persecution.

Political career
In 1996, Mantovano was elected for the first time to the Italian Parliament and joined the National Alliance. He was also re-elected in 2001, 2006 and 2008.

In the XIV legislature (2001–2006), he held the position of undersecretary at the Ministry of the Interior in the Berlusconi governments. He was again appointed Undersecretary of the Interior in the Fourth Berlusconi government, from 2008 to 2011.

In December 2012, Mantovano, together with other MPs of the People of Freedom, voted the confidence to the Monti government, which Berlusconi had instead withdrawn his support. At the end of the Legislature, he decided not to stand as a candidate in the 2013 general elections, and resumed his career as a magistrate.

On 23 October 2022 he was appointed Undersecretary of State to the Presidency of the Council of Ministers in the Meloni government. Mantovano was also delegated to the Authority for the Security of the Republic.

References

1958 births

Living people
The People of Freedom politicians
National Alliance (Italy) politicians
Deputies of Legislature XIII of Italy
Deputies of Legislature XIV of Italy
Senators of Legislature XV of Italy
Deputies of Legislature XVI of Italy
People from Lecce
Politicians of Apulia
Sapienza University of Rome alumni